Anupam Kher (born 7 March 1955) is an Indian actor and the former Chairman of Film and Television Institute of India. He is the recipient of two National Film Awards and eight Filmfare Awards. He has appeared in over 532 films in several languages and many plays. Besides working in Hindi films, he has also appeared in many acclaimed international films such as the Golden Globe nominated Bend It Like Beckham (2002), Ang Lee's Golden Lion–winning Lust, Caution (2007), and David O. Russell's Oscar-winning Silver Linings Playbook (2013).

Hindi films

Other language films

Other credits

Producer

Director

Discography

Dubbing roles

Television

References

External links 

Anupam Kher Foundation
Anupam Kher's Actor Prepares

Indian filmographies
Male actor filmographies